Radio Salankoloto is a radio station in Burkina Faso. It is broadcast on 97.3 FM from the city of Ouagadougou. It was established on November 22, 1996.

It plays mostly African music from traditional to modern hip-hop.

See also
 Media of Burkina Faso

References

External links

Radio stations in Burkina Faso
Community radio stations
Ouagadougou

Radio stations established in 1996